Sheep Track Pumice or Sheep Track Member by Canadian volcanologist Jack Souther, is the name for a pumice deposit in northern British Columbia, Canada. It lies in the Snowshoe Lava Field and is thought to have formed in the Holocene period.

References

Northern Cordilleran Volcanic Province
Volcanology